The Polish Defense is the name commonly given to one of several sequences of chess opening moves characterized by an early ...b5 by Black. The name "Polish Defense" is given by analogy to the Polish Opening, 1.b4. The original line was
1. d4 b5
as played by Alexander Wagner, a Polish player and openings analyst, against Kuhn in the 1913 Swiss Correspondence Championship.  Wagner published an analysis of the opening in Deutsches Wochenschach in 1914, when he was living in Stanislau, Galicia, Austria-Hungary (now Ivano-Frankivsk, Ukraine). Later the name was also applied to
1. d4 Nf6
2. Nf3 b5
and other variants where Black delays playing ...b5 until the second or third move, which are sometimes called the Polish Defense Deferred.

Details
With ...b5, Black tries to take control of c4, but 1.d4 b5 is generally considered dubious after 2.e4, threatening 3.Bxb5.  Modern Chess Openings (MCO-14, 1999) allots two columns to the Polish, commenting that the variants where Black waits and plays 2...b5 instead of 1...b5 are much safer.  Earlier editions of MCO give only a single column of analysis and consider only the 2...b5 lines.  MCO-9 (1957) states that the Polish "fails because it neglects the centre". That negative verdict was softened in the next edition, MCO-10 (1965), to say that the Polish "neglects the centre, but is not refuted".  MCO-12 (1982) retains the "not refuted" assessment and notes that the Polish can result by transposition from the Réti system.   Other judgments have been harsher.  The 1...b5 Polish was deemed "entirely valueless" by I. A. Horowitz in 1964.

The Polish is closely related to the St. George Defence (1.e4 a6, usually followed by 2.d4 b5) into which it often transposes.  Boris Spassky played 1.d4 b5 against Tigran Petrosian in the decisive 22nd game of their world championship match in 1966. Spassky , but rejected an opportunity to draw, as he was behind by a point in the match and with at most three games remaining, he was practically forced to play for a win. Petrosian won the game, thus ensuring retention of his title.

The Polish can be used to combat certain variations of the Réti Opening or King's Indian Attack. In particular, 1.Nf3 Nf6 2.g3 b5 is a fully respectable opening that has been successfully played by former world champion Anatoly Karpov, among others. It prepares to fianchetto Black's  and prevents White from playing the otherwise desirable c4. Note that here 3.e4 would allow 3...Nxe4.

1...b5 against the English Opening is known as the Halibut Gambit (or Jaenisch Gambit).

See also
 List of chess openings
 List of chess openings named after places
 "The Chess Moves 1 b4 and 1...b5" by Edward Winter

Further reading

References

Chess openings
1914 in chess
Chess in Poland